Ímar are a folk band from the British Isles, founded in 2016 in Glasgow, Scotland. They won the Horizon Award for Best Emerging Act at the 2018 BBC Radio 2 Folk Awards.

History
The members of Ímar first met as teenagers through the Comhaltas Ceoltóirí Éireann tutoring program. They reunited in Glasgow and formed the band in 2016, naming it after the Viking warlord Ímar. The profile of the band rose quickly, bolstered by their individual reputations as members of several prominent ensembles. In 2018, the band won the Horizon Award for Best Emerging Act at the BBC Radio 2 Folk Awards.

Musical style

Ímar are a purely instrumental band. Their musical style is derived from the folk music traditions of the nations of each member – Brown is English, Murphy is Irish, Callister and Rhodes are Manx, and Amini is Scottish. Murphy notes that their style is "more of a pure-drop trad sound than most of the other bands we’re involved in". In a review, Johnny Whalley of Folk Radio UK notes that "while the general description 'Celtic' might be appropriate, their music, in fact, derives firmly from the Irish tradition with polkas and slides interspersed with the more generic jigs and reels". He highlights the "intensity, energy and, above all, precision" of their sets. Mike Wade of IOM Today describes their work as "fast, driving tunes, bouncing, infectious reels and slow, beautiful melodic numbers, highlighting individual skills of each player".

Band members

 Adam Brown – Bodhrán
 Ryan Murphy – Flute, tin whistle, and uillean pipes
 Tomás Callister – Fiddle
 Adam Rhodes – Bouzouki
 Mohsen Amini – Concertina

Discography
 Afterlight (2017)
 Avalanche (2018)

See also
Mànran
RURA
Barrule
Talisk
Jamie Smith's Mabon

References

External links
 

Irish folk musical groups
Musical groups established in 2016
Scottish folk music groups
British folk music groups
Musical quintets
Manx musical groups
2016 establishments in Scotland